The Crown Lands Act 1851 is an Act of the UK Parliament.

It established the Commissioners of Works as the body responsible for management of royal parks and gardens, specifically; 
 Saint James's Park
 Hyde Park
 Green Park
 Kensington Gardens
 Chelsea Garden
 The Treasury Garden
 Parliament Square Garden
 Regent's Park
 Primrose Hill
 Victoria Park
 Battersea Park
 Greenwich Park
 Kew Gardens, Pleasure Grounds, and Green
 Kew and Richmond Roads
 Hampton Court Gardens, Green, and Road
 Hampton Court Park
 Richmond Park and Richmond Green
 Bushey Park
 Holyrood Park

See also
Crown Lands Act

References

External links
The Crown Lands Act 1851, as amended, from Legislation.gov.uk.

United Kingdom Acts of Parliament 1851
1851 in British law
1851 in England